Perron's irreducibility criterion is a sufficient condition for a polynomial to be irreducible in —that is, for it to be unfactorable into the product of lower-degree polynomials with integer coefficients.

This criterion is applicable only to monic polynomials. However, unlike other commonly used criteria, Perron's criterion does not require any knowledge of prime decomposition of the polynomial's coefficients.

Criterion
Suppose we have the following polynomial with integer coefficients
 
where . If either of the following two conditions applies:

then  is irreducible over the integers (and by Gauss's lemma also over the rational numbers).

History
The criterion was first published by Oskar Perron in 1907 in Journal für die reine und angewandte Mathematik.

Proof
A short proof can be given based on the following lemma due to Panaitopol: 

Lemma. Then exactly one zero  of  satisfies , and the other  zeroes of  satisfy .

Therefore,  is irreducible.

Generalizations
In his publication Perron provided variants of the criterion for multivariate polynomials over arbitrary fields. In 2010, Bonciocat published novel proofs of these criteria.

See also

Eisenstein's criterion
Cohn's irreducibility criterion

References

Polynomials
Theorems in algebra